Mirosław Kalita (born 18 July 1970) is a retired footballer who played as a midfielder. He currently serves as an assistant coach for the Poland national football team.

References

External links
 

Living people
1970 births
People from Dębica
Polish footballers
Polish football managers
Wisłoka Dębica players
Amica Wronki players
Śląsk Wrocław players
RKS Radomsko players
KSZO Ostrowiec Świętokrzyski players
Resovia (football) players
Stal Stalowa Wola managers
Sportspeople from Podkarpackie Voivodeship